During the 1980s, then Peruvian president Alan García proposed what was supposed to be a radical restructuring of the political and economical divisions of the country: regionalization. The law, which was approved, mandated the creation of regions to function eventually as autonomous economic and administrative entities; 12 regions were formed from 23 of the former 24 departments. Formation of another region was delayed by the reluctance of the Constitutional Province of Callao to merge with the Lima Department. Originally San Martín and La Libertad Regions formed the sole region of San Martín-La Libertad but later were split.

The regions had to assume major responsibilities because of inadequate funding from the central government, and organizational and political difficulties. This political division was never successful, and its implementation was cancelled.

See also
 Regions of Peru
 Peru

 Former